Shan Pengfei (Chinese: 单鹏飞; pinyin: Shàn Péngfēi; born 7 May 1993) is a Chinese footballer who currently plays for Dalian Professional in the Chinese Super League.

Club career
Shan joined Dalian Aerbin youth team system (now known as Dalian Professional) from Dalian Yiteng in January 2012 and was promoted to the first team squad by Aleksandar Stanojević in June 2010. On 27 June 2010, he made his senior debut in the third round of 2012 Chinese FA Cup which Dalian Aerbin beat Beijing Institute of Technology 2–1, coming on as a substitute for Zhou Tong in the stoppage time. The following season, Shan would unfortunately be part of the team that was relegated at the end of the 2014 Chinese Super League campaign. He would remain loyal towards the club and go on establish himself as an integral member of the team that eventually went on to win the division and promotion at the end of the 2017 China League One campaign.

Career statistics 
Statistics accurate as of match played 31 December 2022.

Honours

Club
Dalian Yifang/ Dalian Professional
China League One: 2017.

References

External links
 

1993 births
Living people
Chinese footballers
Association football defenders
Footballers from Dalian
Dalian Professional F.C. players
Chinese Super League players
China League One players